The 1994 Baseball World Cup (BWC) was the 32nd international Men's amateur baseball tournament. The tournament was sanctioned by the International Baseball Federation, which titled it the Amateur World Series from the 1938 tournament through the 1986 AWS. The tournament was held, for the fourth time, in Nicaragua, from August 3 to 14.

Cuba defeated South Korea in the final to win its 21st title.

There were 16 participating countries, split into two groups, with the first four of each group qualifying for the finals.

The next seven competitions were also held as the BWC tournament, which was replaced in 2015 by the quadrennial WBSC Premier12.

First round

Pool A

Pool B

Final round

Final standings

References

External links
XXXII Baseball World Cup - XXXII Copa del Mundo de Béisbol
Archives 1994 

World Cup
Baseball World Cup
1994
1994 in Nicaraguan sport
August 1994 sports events in North America